Christopher Bartolone (born 24 January 1970) is an Italian ice hockey player. He competed in the men's tournament at the 1998 Winter Olympics.

References

External links
 

1970 births
Living people
Olympic ice hockey players of Italy
Ice hockey players at the 1998 Winter Olympics
Ice hockey people from Detroit
Victoriaville Tigres players
Trois-Rivières Draveurs players
HC Milano Saima players
Arizona Sundogs players
American people of Italian descent